Cheon Unyeong (born 1971) is a modern South Korean writer.

Life
Cheon Unyeong was born in 1971 in Seoul, South Korea. She studied creative writing at Seoul Institute of the Arts, and graduated from Hanyang University with a B.A. in journalism. She attended graduate school at Korea University's School of Literature. Although Cheon Unyeong has only produced two volumes of short stories, she is considered a groundbreaking Korean author, and her works have been the subject of much analysis and critical acclaim.

Career
The Literature Translation Institute of Korea summarizes Cheon's work:

Works

Works in translation
 Adieu le cirque!

Works in Korean (partial)
 The Needle (2001)
 Myeongrang (2004)

References

1971 births
South Korean writers
South Korean women novelists
Living people
People from Seoul
Seoul Institute of the Arts alumni
Hanyang University alumni
Korea University alumni